Weigeltisauridae is a family of gliding neodiapsid reptiles that lived during the Late Permian, between 259.51 and 251.9 million years ago. Fossils of weigeltisaurids have been found in Madagascar, Germany, Great Britain, and Russia. A possible weigeltisaurid, Wapitisaurus, been found in Early Triassic strata in North America, but its poor preservation makes referral to the group questionable. They are characterized by long, hollow rod-shaped bones extending from the torso that probably supported wing-like membranes. Similar membranes are also found in several other extinct reptiles such as kuehneosaurids and Mecistotrachelos, as well as living gliding lizards, although each group evolved these structures independently.

Skeleton 

The skulls and jaws of weigeltisaurids are ornamented with horns and tubercles, including chameleon-like frills. The torso and limbs are slender. The skeletons of weigeltisaurds are lightened by large air spaces (skeletal pneumaticity) within the bones. The phalanges of the hands and feet are elongate contrasting strongly with those of most other primitive diapsids, but are similar to those of modern arboreal lizards. Unique to weigeltisaurids, the group possesses between 25 and 30 pairs of long, hollow rod-like bones, which project from the lower abdomen dubbed "patagials". These have been proposed to be modified gastralia or otherwise a novel bone ossification.

Paleobiology 

Weigeltisaurids have been suggested to be arboreal insectivores. Their limb morphology was well adapted for grasping tree bark, including vertical tree trunks. Due to their limb morphology, they were highly adapted for movement in the trees, and would likely have not been capable of moving quickly or efficiently on the ground. The cranial ornamentation may have served a display purpose.

Gliding 
The gliding membrane of weigeltisaurids is distinct from those of other gliding reptiles, which are modified ribs originating from the upper-lateral surface of the body. In contrast, in weigeltisaurids, the rods originate from the lower-lateral surface of the body.  The furling and unfurling of the gliding membrane were likely controlled by the abdominal muscles. Preserved fossils show that the bony rods had a high degree of flexibility, similar to the ribs of living gliding lizards. Due to the low-wing configuration, it is likely that the gliding surface was angled upwards to increase stability. In living gliding lizards, it has been found that the forelimbs grab hold of the membrane during takeoff, allowing them to adjust their trajectory mid-flight. Similar behaviour has been proposed for weigeltisaurids, which is supported the presence of an additional phalange in the fourth digit of the hands of weigeltisaurids, which would have allowed them to more effectively grasp the wing. In a 2011 study comparing Coelurosauravus and other extinct gliding reptiles to modern Draco species, Coelurosauravus was found to be a less efficient glider than modern Draco due to its larger body size, with a substantial drop in height per glide.

Relationships 
Weigeltisaurids have generally been interpreted as neodiapsids that lie outside of Sauria. It has been proposed that they are closely related to the drepanosaurs, a group of arboreal basal neodiapsids native to northern Pangaea during the Late Triassic. The proposed clade containing the two groups was named Avicephala by Senter in 2004. Proposed synapomorphies of the clade include "absence of intercentra in cervical region; absence of intercentra in dorsal region; scapulocoracoid, ratio of anteroposterior length at base of scapular blade to dorsoventral height of scapular blade between 0.4 and 0.25; outer process of fifth metatarsal absent."

Taxonomy 

 Coelurosauravus Lower Sakamena Formation, Madagascar
 Weigeltisaurus Kupferschiefer, Germany, Marl Slate, England
 Rautiania Vyasovka Formation, Russia
 Glaurung Kupferschiefer, Germany

References

Permian diapsids
Triassic diapsids
Avicephalans
Lopingian first appearances
Early Triassic extinctions
Prehistoric reptile families